Lkhagvaagiin Undralbat (born 26 April 1965) is a Mongolian sports shooter. He competed in two events at the 1988 Summer Olympics.

References

1965 births
Living people
Mongolian male sport shooters
Olympic shooters of Mongolia
Shooters at the 1988 Summer Olympics
Place of birth missing (living people)
Shooters at the 1994 Asian Games
Shooters at the 2002 Asian Games
Shooters at the 2006 Asian Games
Asian Games competitors for Mongolia
20th-century Mongolian people